Lamalou-les-Bains (Languedocien: L’Amalon) is a commune in the Hérault département in the Occitanie region in southern France.

Geography
Lamalou-les-Bains is located 53½ miles west of Montpellier in the Orb valley of the southern Cévennes. The village lies at an altitude of 200 metres and offers commanding views of the rivers, lakes and mountains situated in Haut Languedoc.

Population

Its inhabitants are called Lamalousiens in French.

Spa
The waters, which are both hot and cold, are used in cases of rheumatism, sciatica, locomotor ataxia and nervous maladies.

International relations
Lamalou-les-Bains is twinned with:
 Leutkirch im Allgäu, Germany
 Misasa, Japan
 Yaoundé, Cameroon

Festival
Lamalou-les-Bains hosts an annual Operetta Festival in the months of July and August.

See also
Communes of the Hérault department

References

External links

 Town website 
 Tourism office website 
 Spa webpage 
 Description of Saint-Pierre-de-Rhèdes church 
 casino de lamalou les bains 

Communes of Hérault